Urmeniș may refer to the following places in Romania:

 Urmeniș, a commune in Bistrița-Năsăud County
 Urmeniș, a village in the commune Băița de sub Codru, Maramureș County
 Urmeniș, a tributary of the Lechința in Bistrița-Năsăud and Mureș Counties
 Urmeniș (Sălaj), a river in Maramureș County
 Urmeniș (Trotuș), a river in Bacău County